Clara Matéo (born 28 November 1997) is a French professional footballer who plays as a forward or an attacking midfielder for Division 1 Féminine club Paris FC and the France national team.

Club career
Matéo joined Juvisy in June 2016.

International career
Matéo was part of the French squad which won the 2016 UEFA Women's Under-19 Championship. She was named in the team of the tournament.

Matéo made her senior team debut on 27 November 2020 in a 3–0 win against Austria. She scored her first goal four days later in a 12–0 win against Kazakhstan.

Career statistics

International

Scores and results list France's goal tally first, score column indicates score after each Matéo goal.

Honours
France U19
 UEFA Women's Under-19 Championship: 2016

Individual
 UEFA Women's Under-19 Championship Team of the Tournament: 2016
 Trophées UNFP du football Team of the Year: 2021–22
 Trophées FFF D1 Féminine - Team of the Season: 2021–2022
 Division 1 Féminine Player of the Month: February 2022

Notes

References

External links
 
 
 Player profile  at footofeminin.fr
 

1997 births
Living people
French women's footballers
Footballers from Nantes
Women's association football forwards
France women's international footballers
France women's youth international footballers
UEFA Women's Euro 2022 players
Division 1 Féminine players
Division 2 Féminine players
Paris FC (women) players